A paw is the soft foot of a mammal, generally a quadruped, that has claws or nails.

Paw may also refer to:
 Paw, "Parents are watching", an SMS language abbreviation
 Paw (band), a musical group 
 Paw (film), a 1959 film
 Paw Lagermann, composer, member of the popduo Infernal
 Paw Tracks, an independent record label based in Washington, D.C. 

Paws may refer to:
 Paws (Detroit Tigers), the mascot for the Detroit Tigers of Major League Baseball
 Paws (EP), an EP by Four Tet
 Paws (film), a 1997 Australian independent film starring Billy Connolly
 Paws (Northeastern), the mascot for the Northeastern University Huskies
 Paws, Inc., the U.S. company that produces the comic strip Garfield

PAW may refer to:
 Neopup PAW-20 (Personal Assault Weapon, 20 mm), a grenade launcher
 Pentecostal Assemblies of the World, a Oneness Pentecostal organization
 Physics Analysis Workstation
 Pintubi Anmatjere Warlpiri Media or PAW Media, a media company in remote Yurendumu, NT, Australia 
 Plasma arc welding
 Post Apocalyptic World
 Princeton Alumni Weekly
 Professional Adventure Writer
 Project African Wilderness
 Projector augmented wave method, a method of solid state physics to calculate the electronic structure of materials
 Prodigious accumulator of wealth, a term used in the book The Millionaire Next Door

PAWS may refer to:
 Performing Animal Welfare Society, an advocacy group and sanctuary for abandoned or abused performing animals based in Galt, California
a Planted Ancient Woodland Site
 Progressive Animal Welfare Society, an organization based in Lynnwood, Washington, that rehabilitates wildlife, shelters pets, assists in pet adoption and educates the public
 P.A.W.S., or Pets Are Wonderful Support, a group of North American nonprofit organisations promoting pets to extend the quality of life and life-span of elderly or disabled persons
 Philippine Animal Welfare Society, a non-governmental institution in the Philippines advocating on animal rights and welfare
 Pakistan Animal Welfare Society, a non-governmental institution in Pakistan advocating on animal rights and welfare
 Post-acute-withdrawal syndrome, a medical condition affecting recovering addicts during the first few months or years of their sobriety
 Professional Adventure Writer, an adventure creation system for the ZX Spectrum computer
 Protect Against Wrapped Sequence numbers, a feature of Transmission Control Protocol
 Protocol to Access White-Space - a protocol specification for radio white-space database access
 PAVE PAWS or Phased Array Warning System, a United States' Air Force Space Command radar system
 Wasilla Airport (ICAO location indicator: PAWS), in Wasilla, Alaska, United States
 PAWS (band)

See also
 Paw Paw (disambiguation)